Katja Stam (born 3 October 1998) is a Dutch beach volleyball player. She competed in the 2020 Summer Olympics. Stam shares the same birthday with her partner Raïsa Schoon.

References

External links

1998 births
Living people
Sportspeople from Emmen, Netherlands
Beach volleyball players at the 2020 Summer Olympics
Dutch beach volleyball players
Olympic beach volleyball players of the Netherlands